The 15th Annual GMA Dove Awards were held on 1984 recognizing accomplishments of musicians for the year 1983. The show was held in Nashville, Tennessee.

Award recipients
Song of the Year
"More Than Wonderful"; Lanny Wolfe; Lanny Wolfe Music (ASCAP)
Songwriter of the Year
Lanny Wolfe
Male Vocalist of the Year
Russ Taff
Female Vocalist of the Year
Sandi Patti
Group of the Year
No award given in this category
Artist of the Year
Sandi Patti
Southern Gospel Album of the Year
We Shall Behold the King; Rex Nelon Singers; Ken Harding; Canaan Records
Inspirational Album of the Year
More Than Wonderful;  Sandi Patti; Greg Nelson, Sandi Patti, David T. Clydesdale; Impact Records
Pop/Contemporary Album of the Year
Side By Side; The Imperials; Keith Thomas, Neal Joseph; DaySpring Records
Contemporary Gospel Album of the Year
Come Together; Bobby Jones and New Life; Tony Brown; Myrrh Records
Traditional Gospel Album of the Year
We Sing Praises; Sandra Crouch; Sandra Crouch; Light Records
Instrumentalist
Phil Driscoll
Praise and Worship Album of the Year
Celebrate The Joy; David T. Clydesdale; Impact
Children's Music Album of the Year
Music Machine II; Tony Salerno, Fletch Wiley, Ron Kreuger; Birdwing
Musical Album
Dreamer; Cam Floria; Christian Artists
Recorded Music Packaging of the Year
Dennis Hill, Michael Borum, Bill Farrell; A Christmas Album; Amy Grant
Album by a Secular Artist
Surrender; Debby Boone; Brown Bannister; Sparrow Records

External links
 https://doveawards.com/awards/past-winners/

GMA Dove Awards
1984 music awards
1984 in American music
1984 in Tennessee
GMA